Leuconitocris bicoloricornis is a species of beetle in the family Cerambycidae. It was described by Stephan von Breuning in 1965.

References

Leuconitocris
Beetles described in 1965